The Overland Park Convention Center, opened in 2002 and hosts on average 330 events each year. The OPCC sits on a  site in Overland Park, the largest suburb in the Kansas City, Missouri metropolitan area and the second largest city in Kansas. Edwin C. Eilert Ballroom.

OPCC was designed by architectural firm DLR Group.
Major partners include Pepsi, Fern Exposition, Fiorella's Jack Stack Barbecue.

Image gallery

Events

The Overland Park Convention Center hosts a variety of events throughout the year, from large consumer shows to dance competitions to conventions to small corporate meetings.  Some of the annual events include:

 Johnson County Boat Show
 Johnson County Home and Garden Show
 KC Bridal Spectacular
 Heartland Model Car Nationals
 Missouri District Youth Convention 2006-2012 (United Pentecostal Church International)
 Naka-Kon
 Royals Fan Fest (2009 - 2013)]
 Kantcon Tabletop Gaming Convention

External links
 Overland Park Convention Center Official website

Convention centers in the United States
Event venues in Kansas
Buildings and structures in Overland Park, Kansas
Tourist attractions in Johnson County, Kansas